Like a Prayer is the fourth studio album by American singer-songwriter Madonna, released on March 21, 1989, by Sire Records. Madonna worked with Stephen Bray, Patrick Leonard, and Prince on the album, with her co-writing and co-producing all the songs. Her most introspective release at the time, Like a Prayer is a confessional record. Madonna described the album as a collection of songs about her mother, father, and bonds with her family. It was dedicated to Madonna's mother, who died when she was young.

Like a Prayer is a pop album and incorporates elements of rock, R&B, gospel, and funk. Madonna drew from her Catholic upbringing, as seen on the album's title track, which was also released as its lead single. The lyrics deal with themes from Madonna's childhood and adolescence, such as the death of her mother in "Promise to Try", the importance of family in "Keep It Together", and her relationship with her father in "Oh Father", as well as encouraging female empowerment in "Express Yourself".

Like a Prayer received universal acclaim from music critics, who praised the songwriting and recognized Madonna's increased artistic merit. The album was featured in several musical reference books and best-of lists including [[Rolling Stone's 500 Greatest Albums of All Time|''Rolling Stones 500 Greatest Albums of All Time]], Colin Larkin’s All Time Top 1000 Albums, 1001 Albums You Must Hear Before You Die and Spin Alternative Record Guide. Commercially, the album was an international success, reaching the top of the charts in 20 countries, and was certified quadruple platinum in the US by the Recording Industry Association of America (RIAA). Worldwide, it has sold over 15 million copies and is one of the best-selling albums by women. Six accompanying singles were released: the title track, "Express Yourself", "Cherish", "Oh Father", "Dear Jessie", and "Keep It Together". "Like a Prayer" became Madonna's seventh number-one hit on the US Billboard Hot 100, while "Express Yourself" and "Cherish" both peaked at number two, and "Keep It Together" became a top-10 hit.

With the singles' music videos, Madonna furthered her creativity and became known as a leading figure in the format. The music video for "Like a Prayer" was met with controversy worldwide over its use of religious imagery, including the appropriation of Catholic iconography such as stigmata and the burning crosses of the Ku Klux Klan, as well as a dream about making love to a Black saint, and a scene depicting an interracial murder by white supremacist groups. Family and Christian groups including the Vatican protested its broadcast and threatened to boycott Pepsi for having ties with Madonna. Eventually, Pepsi caved in to the protest and canceled the sponsorship, allowing Madonna to keep her $5 million paycheck in advance. Like a Prayer preceded Madonna's Blond Ambition World Tour, which she used to promote it. At the end of the 1980s, following the release of the album, Madonna was named artist of the decade by several publications.

 Background 
1988 was a quiet year on the recording front for Madonna. Following the lack of critical and commercial success of her 1987 film Who's That Girl, she acted in the Broadway production Speed-the-Plow. However, unfavorable reviews once again caused discomfort for Madonna. Her marriage to actor Sean Penn ended and the couple filed for divorce in January 1989. Madonna had also turned 30, one year removed from the age at which her mother had died, and thus the singer experienced more emotional turmoil. She commented for the May 1989 issue of Interview that her Catholic upbringing struck a feeling of guilt in her all the time:
Because in Catholicism you are a born sinner and you're a sinner all your life. No matter how you try to get away from it, the sin is within you all the time. It was this fear that haunted me; it taunted and pained me every moment. My music was probably the only distraction I had.

Madonna came to the realisation that as she and her fans were growing up, it was time for her to move away from the teen appeal to wider audiences, and cash in on the longevity of the album market. Feeling the need to attempt something different, Madonna wanted the sound of her new album to indicate what could be popular in the music world. For lyrical ideas of the title track, she chose topics that until then had been personal meditations never shared with the general public. Madonna told SongTalk magazine "In the past I wrote a lot of songs that [revealed my inner self], but I felt they were too honest or too frightening or too scary and I decided not to record them." She decided to take a more adult, sophisticated approach; thoughtfully, she sifted through her personal journals and diaries, and began considering her options. She recalled, "What was it I wanted to say? I wanted the album and the song to speak to things on my mind. It was a complex time in my life." The singer had certain matters on her mind, including her troubled relationship with her husband Penn, her family, her lost mother, and even her belief in God.

 Development 

Like a Prayer drew its title from Catholicism's influence on Madonna's early life, as well as her struggles with religion; "The theme of Catholicism runs rampant", she said. "It's me struggling with the mystery and magic that surrounds it. My own Catholicism is in constant upheaval." Recording sessions took place from September 1988 to January 1989. On January 27, 1989, a press release from The Albany Herald said the album would include "a number of hot dance tracks" but noted, "much of the material [...] is of a personal tone". The singer described it as a collection of songs "about my mother, my father, and bonds with my family. [...] It's taken a lot of guts to do this." She also said that Like a Prayer would be her "most different" work to date; "It was a real coming-of-age record for me emotionally, I had to do a lot of soul-searching, and I think it is a reflection of that [...] I didn't try to candy-coat anything or make it more palatable for mass consumption, I wrote what I felt." Madonna described Like a Prayer as a reflection of past musical influences, in contrast to current influences for her previous work.

Madonna chose to collaborate with Stephen Bray and Patrick Leonard, with whom she had collaborated on her previous studio album True Blue (1986) and the Who's That Girl soundtrack (1987). Both Bray and Leonard wanted to bring their unique style to the project, and they developed completely different music for the title track. Eventually, Madonna felt that the music presented to her by Leonard was more interesting, and she started to work with him. According to the singer, Leonard was also facing emotional turmoil; "I was working with Pat, who was also in a very dark state of mind, and we worked in a very isolated place in the Valley." On January 6, 1989, following a nullified divorce filing in late 1987 and several publicized fights, one of which led to a 60-day prison term, Madonna and Penn filed for divorce.  This incident inspired the song "Till Death Do Us Part". The rest of the songs were written within two weeks, with "Like a Prayer", "Cherish" and "Spanish Eyes" being penned in the first week. According to Leonard, "we wrote a song a day, and we didn't change them. And oftentimes the vocal that she did was the lead vocal, we didn't even change the lead vocal. That was it. She sang it. It was done."

Recording artist Prince played the guitar on three songs from Like a Prayer, "Like a Prayer", "Keep It Together", and "Act of Contrition", though he remained uncredited.  Prince and Madonna also worked together on the track "Love Song". The song was recorded at Prince's Studio on Paisley Park; "We were friends and talked about working together, so I went to Minneapolis to write some stuff with him, but the only thing I really dug was 'Love Song' [...] We ended up writing it long-distance, because I had to be in L.A. and he couldn't leave Minneapolis, and quite frankly I couldn't stand Minneapolis. When I went there, it was like 20 degrees below zero, and it was really desolate. I was miserable and I couldn't write or work under those circumstances", Madonna recalled.

For the artwork, Madonna chose to work with photographer Herb Ritts. Initially, photos from the session with Ritts were also to be used for the lead single's packaging. When it came to the photoshoot, she decided to dye her blonde hair brown; she commented, "I love blonde hair, but it really does something different to you. I feel more grounded when I have dark hair. It's unexplainable. I also feel more Italian when my hair is dark." The cover art features a close-up of the singer's jean-clad midsection and bare midriff. The cover has been seen as a reference to Sticky Fingers (1971) by the Rolling Stones. The packaging for the first pressings of the CD, cassette, and LP were scented with patchouli oils to simulate church incense.  A publicist for Warner Bros. Records revealed this had been Madonna's idea; "She wanted to create a flavor of the 60's and the church. She wanted to create a sensual feeling you could hear and smell." Initial pressings also included an insert with safe sex guidelines and a warning about the dangers of AIDS, to which Madonna had lost friends. Its inclusion was decided after Warner Bros. had agreed to release an album by stand-up comedian Sam Kinison the year before, although he had stated that AIDS came from gay men involved in bestiality.  Madonna dedicated the album to "My mother, who taught me how to pray".

 Music and lyrics 

Like a Prayer is a pop album, which incorporates elements of rock, R&B, gospel, and funk. According to Stephen Holden, Like a Prayer "teems with 60's and early 70's echoes – of the Beatles, Simon & Garfunkel, and Sly and the Family Stone – all pumped up with a brash, if occasionally klutzy, 80's sense of showmanship". The album is a confessional record; in Madonna's own words, the songs "intertwine her search for faith with her search for her mother".  Like a Prayer uses live instrumentation, in contrast to the sound of Madonna's previous albums. The opening track is "Like a Prayer", which was also the first song developed for Like a Prayer. Once Madonna had conceptualized the way she would interpose her ideas with the music, she wrote the song in about three hours. She described "Like a Prayer" as the song of a passionate young girl "so in love with God that it is almost as though He were the male figure in her life". It is a pop rock song with elements of gospel music. A choir provides background vocals that heighten the song's spiritual nature, and a rock guitar keeps the music dark and mysterious.

The second track, "Express Yourself", talks about rejecting material pleasures and only accepting the best for oneself; throughout the song, subtexts are employed. According to the singer, the track is a tribute to Sly and the Family Stone. The third track, "Love Song", is a duet with Prince. The song was co-written by Madonna and Prince and features the artist's "signature scratchy disco guitar break[ing] through Madonna's synths".
Originally titled "State of Matrimony", the song "Till Death Do Us Part" talks about the violent dissolution of Madonna's marriage. It was described as "an anxious jumpy ballad that describes a marriage wracked with drinking, violent quarrels and a possessive, self-hating husband". The next song, "Promise to Try", talks about the death of Madonna's mother. In one part of the song, she specifically asks: "Does she hear my voice in the night when I call?" Later, an adult seems to admonish a child with the lyrics, "Little girl, don't you forget her face/Don't let memory play games with your mind/She's a faded smile frozen in time."

The sixth track, and third single from Like a Prayer, is "Cherish". Built around the themes of love and relationship, with William Shakespeare's Romeo and Juliet being one of the major inspirations, the song includes a line from "Cherish" by the 1960s band the Association. The lyrics illustrate "Cherish" as a simple love song, where Madonna talks about devotion and having her lover by her side, whom she would never leave. Following "Cherish" is "Dear Jessie"; according to Rikky Rooksby, the song sounds more like a children's lullaby than a pop song. The lyrics encourage the little girl Jessie to use her imagination. The song summons up a psychedelic landscape, where pink elephants roam with dancing moons and mermaids. It references fairy-tale characters and creates an image of children playing with each other. The nexus of the album's eighth song, "Oh Father", talks about the presence of male authoritative figures in Madonna's life, most prominently her father Tony Ciccone. Madonna's insecurities about her childhood shows up in anxieties during her vocal performance. Author J. Randy Taraborrelli held that "Till Death Do Us Part", "Promise To Try", and "Oh Father" are songs where Madonna tries to "purge herself of certain personal demons".

The lyrics of "Keep It Together" talk about the realization of how important Madonna's family has been as a form of stability in her life. In an interview with Interview magazine, Madonna expressed that she did not feel close to anybody in her family when she was growing up, and competed with her siblings in school grades for her father's attention. "Spanish Eyes" is said to have "confronted the still-taboo issue of AIDS". Carol Benson and Allen Metz, authors of The Madonna Companion: Two Decades of Commentary, described the song as "a cross between Ben E. King's 'Spanish Harlem' and something by Billy Joel". The final song, "Act of Contrition", features Madonna reciting the Catholic prayer of the same name, before the vocals deteriorate into a monologue in which Madonna grows obstreperous over being denied a restaurant reservation.

 Release and promotion 
The album was released on March 21, 1989 on LP, cassette, and compact disc. Madonna performed an energetic version of "Express Yourself" during the 1989 MTV Video Music Awards. She started the performance by descending from a flight of stairs, wearing a pin-striped suit and a monocle. Later she removed the coat to reveal her bustier, and together with her backing singers Niki Haris and Donna De Lory, performed a dance routine called voguing. Ian Inglis, author of Performance and Popular Music: History, Place and Time, noted that the historical importance of Madonna's performance at the Video Music Awards was due to the televisual venue. Inglis explained that since Madonna's performance was striking primarily as a high-energy, provocatively choreographed, dance production number, it went on to highlight the 'TV' part of MTV, and in a way heralded her and the network as a cultural arbiter. In August 1989, in order to promote the release of Like a Prayer in Japan, Warner Music released a remix extended play titled Remixed Prayers, which included several remixes of "Like a Prayer" and "Express Yourself". It was released exclusively in Japan until July 1993, when the EP was released in Australia to celebrate Madonna's first visit to the country as part of her Girlie Show World Tour. The EP reached number 92 on the ARIA Albums Chart and was present on the chart for three weeks, and also charted at number 24 on the Oricon weekly albums chart, on which it charted for five weeks.

 Pepsi partnership 
In January 1989, Pepsi-Cola announced that they had signed Madonna for US$5 million deal to feature the singer and "Like a Prayer" for a high-profile television commercial. The deal also included Pepsi sponsoring the then-upcoming Blond Ambition World Tour. Madonna wanted to use the commercial to launch the album and its lead single globally before its release — the first time something like this was being done in the music industry. Titled "Make a Wish", the two-minute commercial portrayed Madonna going back in time to her childhood memories. An estimated 250 million people around the world viewed the commercial.

The day after the Pepsi commercial premiered, Madonna released the actual music video for "Like a Prayer" on MTV. Religious groups worldwide, including the Vatican immediately protested the clip, saying that it contained blasphemous use of Christian imagery. They called for the national boycott of Pepsi and PepsiCo's subsidiaries, including fast food chains Kentucky Fried Chicken, Taco Bell, and Pizza Hut. Despite being taken aback by the protests, Pepsi initially wanted to continue airing the commercial, explaining the differences between their advertisement and Madonna's artistic opinions in the video. They ultimately gave in to the protests and cancelled the campaign, and were so eager to extricate themselves from the collaboration that Madonna was allowed to keep the US$5 million advance.

 Singles 

The title track was released as the lead single from Like a Prayer on March 3, 1989. The song was acclaimed by critics, and was a commercial success. It became Madonna's seventh number-one single on the US Billboard Hot 100, and topped the singles charts in eighteen countries, including Australia, Canada, and the United Kingdom. 

"Express Yourself" was released as the second single from the album on May 9, 1989. The song received positive reviews from critics, who applauded the gender equality message of the song and complimented the song for being a hymn to freedom and encouragement to women, as well as all oppressed minorities. Commercially, the song peaked at number two on the US Billboard Hot 100, and became Madonna's sixth number-one hit on the European Hot 100 Singles chart. It also reached the top of the singles charts in Canada and Switzerland, and the top five elsewhere.

"Cherish" was released as the third single on August 1, 1989. After its release, the song received positive feedback from reviewers, who were surprised by the change of content and the lighter image of Madonna's music, unlike her previous singles from Like a Prayer that incorporated themes such as religion and sexuality. On the US Billboard Hot 100, "Cherish" became Madonna's 16th consecutive top-five single, setting a record in the history of the chart. It was also a commercial success elsewhere, topping the singles chart in Canada, and reaching the top-10 of the charts in Australia, Belgium, Ireland, the UK and the combined European chart.   It also featured the B-side, "Supernatural", previously unreleased from the album sessions. Released on October 24, 1989 as the fourth single, 

"Oh Father" received positive reviews from critics and authors, but commercially was less successful than Madonna's previous singles. In most of the countries where it was released, the song failed to attain top-ten positions, except in Finland, where it peaked at number six. It ended Madonna's string of 16 consecutive top-five singles in the US.

"Dear Jessie" was released as the fifth single from Like a Prayer on December 10, 1989. The release of "Dear Jessie" was limited to the UK, certain other European countries, Australia, and Japan. Upon its release, "Dear Jessie" received mixed reviews from critics, who complained about the overdone fantasy imagery of the song, but complimented its composition. The track was a moderate success commercially, reaching the top 10 in the UK and Ireland and the top-20 in Germany, Spain, and Switzerland. 

"Keep It Together" was released on January 30, 1990, as the sixth and final single from Like a Prayer. The song received mixed reviews from critics, but was commercially successful, reaching a peak of number eight on the US Billboard Hot 100 and Canadian charts, while topping the dance chart in the US. In Australia, it reached number one along with Madonna's next release, "Vogue".

 Tour 

Like a Prayer, alongside Madonna's following album I'm Breathless (1990), was promoted in her third concert tour, the Blond Ambition World Tour, which visited Asia, North America, and Europe. Originally planned as the "Like a Prayer World Tour", it consisted of 57 dates and was divided into five different sections; the first inspired by the 1927 German expressionist film Metropolis, the second by religious themes, the third by the film Dick Tracy (1990) and cabaret, the fourth by Art Deco, and the fifth was an encore. The show contained sexual themes and Catholic imagery, such as in the performances of "Like a Prayer" and "Oh Father", which were based in church-like surroundings with Madonna wearing a crucifix and her backup dancers dressed like priests and nuns. A lighter moment was the performance of "Cherish", which featured dancers dressed up as Mermen and Madonna playing the harp.

The concert was criticized for its sexual content and religious imagery; in Toronto, Canada, Madonna was threatened with arrest for obscenity, and Pope John Paul II later called for a boycott, with one of the three Italian dates being cancelled. Despite this, the tour was a critical success, winning "Most Creative Stage Production" at the 1990 Pollstar Concert Industry Awards.  Two different shows were recorded and released on video; Blond Ambition: Japan Tour 90, taped in Yokohama, Japan, on April 27, 1990, and Blond Ambition World Tour Live, taped in Nice, France, on August 5, 1990.

 Critical reception 

Like a Prayer was met with universal acclaim from music critics. Stephen Thomas Erlewine, from AllMusic, said in retrospect that it was Madonna's "most explicit attempt at a major artistic statement", and that though she is trying to be "serious", the singer delivers a range of well-written pop songs, making the album her "best and most consistent". Annie Zaleski, from The A.V. Club, praised the album for its extensive discussion of parental issues, and described it as Madonna's first "truly substantial" record. In Rolling Stone, reviewer J. D. Considine wrote that Madonna's fame up to that point had been built more on "image than artistry", but that with Like a Prayer Madonna was asking, successfully, to be taken seriously; "Daring in its lyrics, ambitious in its sonics, this is far and away the most self-consciously serious album she's made. There are no punches pulled, anywhere". Considine concluded his review by hailing the album "as close to art as pop music gets ... proof not only that Madonna should be taken seriously as an artist but that hers is one of the most compelling voices of the Eighties".

Robert Christgau from The Village Voice lamented the "kiddie psychedelia" of "Dear Jessie", and was unmoved by "Promise to Try" and "Act of Contrition", but felt all the other songs were memorable, especially the "cocksucker's prayer" of "Like a Prayer" and the "thrilling", independence-themed "Oh Father" and "Express Yourself". Lloyd Bradley of Q said, "Musically it's varied, unexpected and far from instantly accessible; lyrically, it's moving, intelligent and candid." Edna Gundersen from USA Today described the album's songwriting as a "confessional feast", with the emphasis on Madonna's Catholic upbringing as the highlight. Songs are rife with religious overtones, spiritual and hymnal arrangements and a host of references to joy, faith, sin and power". NME critic David Quantick hailed Like a Prayer as "a brilliant, thoughtful, startling and joyful example of popular music".

Jonathan Takiff from The Philadelphia Inquirer praised the album for being "serious and reflective, at times heavily laden with psychic trauma. You might consider Like a Prayer to be [Madonna]'s Misfits...or her hour in the confessional box". Sal Cinquemani, from Slant Magazine, described the album as "a collection of pop confections layered with live instrumentation, sophisticated arrangements, deeply felt lyrics, and a stronger, more assured vocal". The review concluded by declaring Like a Prayer as "one of the quintessential pop albums of all time". Barry Walters from the San Francisco Examiner praised the album's cohesiveness, and described it as Madonna "[crossing] the boundary between craft and inspiration." Walters later wrote in The New Rolling Stone Album Guide that Like a Prayer, with its more substantial songs that "covered topics such as spousal abuse and familial neglect", "effectively upped Madonna's ante as a serious artist".

Negative criticism came from Spin magazine. Reviewer Christian Logan wrote: "On Like a Prayer your relationship to Madonna changes from to song to song, and it makes you uncomfortable. It's like sitting on a table with a friend who's telling too much about herself to people she doesn't know." Joe Levy, from the same magazine, was also critical, writing that "there's not a lot of old Madonna, nothing of the generation of women who grew up in her wake: Regina, Debbie Gibson, and Taylor Dayne", but highlighted "Keep It Together" as "the only great dance song on the record".

 Commercial performance 
In the US, Like a Prayer debuted at number 11 on the Billboard 200, on the issue dated April 8, 1989. It quickly rose to the top of the chart after three weeks, remaining there for six consecutive ones, thus becoming Madonna's longest-running number one album.  The album spent a total of 77 weeks on the chart. Like a Prayer also reached a peak of number 55 on Billboards R&B Albums list. It was eventually certified quadruple-platinum by the Recording Industry Association of America (RIAA) for shipments of four million units in the US. Like a Prayer has sold over 5,000,000 copies in the US, as of March 2015. In Canada, the album debuted at number two on the RPM Albums Chart on May 1, 1989. It was present for a total of 37 weeks on the chart, and was certified five times platinum by the Canadian Recording Industry Association (CRIA) for shipments of 500,000 copies in Canada.

Throughout Europe, Like a Prayer also did well on its charts and topped the European Top 100 Albums. The album moved 3 million units across the continent by July 1989, a sum that increased to 5 million by May 1990. In the UK, Like a Prayer debuted at number one on the UK Albums Chart, on April 1, 1989. It remained on this position for two weeks and spent a total of 73 weeks on the chart. The album was certified four-times platinum by the British Phonographic Industry (BPI) for shipments of 1.2 million copies in the UK. According to Belgium's national IFPI group SIBESA, Like A Prayer was amongst the top five best selling international albums of 1989 in Belgium. In France, the album debuted at number one on the French Albums Chart on April 9, 1989, staying there for two weeks, totaling 36 weeks on it. In July 1989, it was certified platinum by the Syndicat National de l'Édition Phonographique (SNEP) for shipments of 300,000 copies in France, and once again in 2001, for shipments of 600,000 copies. In the Netherlands, Like a Prayer entered the MegaCharts at number four during the week of April 4, 1990. It eventually reached the top position, staying a total of 32 weeks on the chart. In Germany, Like a Prayer topped the Media Control albums chart for one month, and was later certified three times gold by the Bundesverband Musikindustrie (BVMI) for having shipped over 750,000 copies in the country. In Italy, Like a Prayer debuted at the number one position at Musica e dischi charts, remaining seven consecutive weeks in that position. Set "Tipo" on "Album". Then, in the "Artista" field, search "Madonna".  By June 1989, the album had sold 550,000 copies there, and remains as one of the best-selling albums in Italy with sales of over 800,000 units.

The album was commercially successful in Asia-Pacific countries. In Japan, Like a Prayer reached number one on the Oricon Albums Chart and remained on the chart for 22 weeks. At the 1990 Japan Gold Disc Awards held by the Recording Industry Association of Japan (RIAJ), Madonna won three awards for Best Album of the Year – Pops Solo, Grand Prix Album of the Year, and Grand Prix Artist of the Year; the last two were given for the best-selling international album and the best-selling international artist of the year, respectively. The album also became her sixth platinum album in Hong Kong. In Malaysia, the album sold 23,000 units on the first day of release, and another 7,000 copies in two weeks. In Australia, Like a Prayer debuted and peaked at number four on April 2, 1989, and was certified quadruple-platinum by the Australian Recording Industry Association (ARIA) for shipments of 280,000 copies. In New Zealand, the album peaked at number two, and was certified double platinum by the Recorded Music NZ for shipments of 30,000 copies.

The album also achieved success in Latin America, where it received a platinum certification from the Cámara Argentina de Productores de Fonogramas y Videogramas (CAPIF) for surpassing 60,000 copies units. Actual sales in Argentina stand at more than 270,000 copies, as of 1992. In Brazil, Like a Prayer received a double platinum certification from Associação Brasileira dos Produtores de Discos (ABPD) for the sales of 500,000 copies. It ultimately sold 710,000 units as of 1993 and became in one of the best-selling albums by an international artist in the country. Like a Prayer has sold over 15 million copies worldwide.

 Legacy 
Entertainment Weeklys Nicholas Fonseca felt that Like a Prayer marked "an official turning point" of Madonna's career, which earned her "a long-awaited, substantive dose of critical acclaim". Mark Savage from BBC noted that the album's release "marks the moment when critics first begin to describe Madonna as an artist, rather than a mere pop singer". Glen Levy from Time stated: "Madonna has always been a keen student of pop-culture history, and her creative powers were probably at their peak in the late 1980s on the album Like a Prayer." Hadley Freeman from The Guardian opined that Like a Prayer shaped "how pop stars, pop music, music videos, love, sex and the 80s were and should be". LA Weeklys Art Tavana expressed that "Like a Prayer was the moment when Madonna went from being the voice of America's teenagers to the worldwide high priestess of pop". With the release of Like a Prayer, Madonna's impact culminated during the 1980s, and many publications named her the artist of the decade.

Taraborrelli wrote that Like a Prayer was a turning point's in Madonna's career; "Every important artist has at least one album in his or her career whose critical and commercial success becomes the artist's magic moment; for Madonna [...] Like a Prayer was. [Madonna] pushed onwards as an artist, using her creative wit to communicate on another level, musically." Kenneth G. Bielen, author of The Lyrics of Civility: Biblical Images and Popular Music Lyrics in American Culture, wrote that with the album, Madonna began to be seen as a serious artist; "Five years earlier, she was a dance-pop 'Boy-Toy'. With Like a Prayer, she proved she was an artist who could think with more than her body."

Thomas Harrison on the book Music of the 1980s, documented that Like a Prayer pushed boundaries by addressing "uncomfortable song topics". Jon Pareles, from The New York Times, said that " [Like a Prayer] defiantly grabbed Christian language and imagery". Similarly, Zaleski, for The A.V. Club, praised the album for "starting a conversation about religion—which remains one of the most incendiary topics a musician can address. [...] All of this pointed to Madonna establishing herself as a serious artist (emphasis on the "art") who had significant things to say".

According to Christopher Rosa from VH1, "Like a Prayer was the first pop album to evoke what female artists explore today: sexuality, religion, gender equality and independence. It was pioneering, and no woman in music has come close to doing something as groundbreaking." He believed that the album was her peak of cultural and musical influence, saying that "Madonna went from bubbly pop act to a serious artist who received her first bout of universal acclaim". Rosa also stated that Like a Prayer will be always more influential than the "iconic" albums of contemporary female artists, such as Blackout (2007), The Fame Monster (2009), and Beyoncé (2013). Singer Taylor Swift stated that with the album, Madonna made "the most incredible, bold, risky, decisions as far as pop music goes", calling the title track "legitimately one of the greatest pop songs of all time".

 Music videos 

According to Douglas Kellner, Like a Prayer and its singles were particularly influential on the music video field. Madonna tried to experiment with different forms and styles with the videos and in the process, she constructed a new set of image and identity. The video for "Like a Prayer", which depicted Madonna as a witness to a murder of a white girl by white supremacists, Catholic symbols such as stigmata, Ku Klux Klan-style cross burning, and a dream about kissing a black saint, was extremely controversial and gained a great deal of attention. Pareles wrote that the video "set a media circus in motion, stirring up just those issues of sexuality and religiosity that Madonna wanted to bring up". The Vatican condemned the video, while critics observed sacrilege and heresy. Madonna commented, "Art should be controversial, and that's all there is to it." Taraborrelli wrote that the song and its video also served to enhance Madonna's reputation as "a shrewd businesswoman, someone who knows how to sell a concept". Stewart M. Hoover wrote that the music video pushed boundaries by "bringing traditional religious imagery into the popular music context". Similarly, Daniel Welsh from The Huffington Post wrote that the video "catapulted Madonna to the ranks of music video heavyweight, and proved to the world she really meant business".

The music video for "Express Yourself" was also noted by critics for its exploitation of female sexuality, and they came to the conclusion that Madonna's masculine image in the video was gender-bending; authors Santiago Fouz-Hernández and Freya Jarman-Ivens commented that "the video portrayed the deconstructive gender-bending approach associated with free play and self-reflexivity of images in postmodernism". Michelle Gibson and Deborah Townsend Meem, authors of Femme/Butch, commended the video for showing a shift in power between the sexes, declaring that "Madonna assertively claimed all possible gender space like Marlene Dietrich". The video for "Express Yourself" was the most expensive video at the time of its release. Author John Semonche explained in his book Censoring Sex that with her True Blue and Like a Prayer-era music videos, Madonna pushed the envelope of what could be shown on television, which resulted in increase of her popularity.

 Critic lists and accolades 
In 2003, Rolling Stone magazine named Like a Prayer the 239th greatest album of all time, maintaining the rating in a 2012 revised list, before moving to number 331 in a 2020 edition. In 2005, a poll of 500,000 people by Channel 4 placed Like a Prayer at number eight on list of "The 100 Greatest Albums in Music History". In the same year, Like a Prayer was featured in the book 1001 Albums You Must Hear Before You Die. The following year, Q magazine placed the album at number 14 in its list of "40 Best Albums of the '80s". According to the 2006 list of "All-TIME 100 Albums" by Time magazine's critics, Like a Prayer is one of the 100 greatest and most influential musical compilations since 1954. Like a Prayer was featured in the book Spin Alternative Record Guide with a perfect score of 10/10 from reviewer Rob Sheffield, given to those records to be either "[a]n unimpeachable masterpiece or a flawed album of crucial historical significance". The album was placed at number 237 in the All Time Top 1000 Albums.

In 2012, Slant Magazine listed the album at number 20 on its list of "Best Albums of the 1980s", saying: "By the late '80s, Madonna was already one of the biggest pop stars of all time, but with Like a Prayer, she became one of the most important".  The album was also featured in the Rolling Stone "Women Who Rock" list made in 2012, at number 18. In 2019, The Independent named it one of the 40 best albums you have to listen before you die. In a 2020 review, Spin magazine named Like a Prayer the eighth best album of the last 35 years.

At the end of 1989, Like a Prayer was voted the 18th best record of the year in the Pazz & Jop, an annual poll of American critics published by The Village Voice, and was nominated for a Grammy Award for Best Engineered Album. Billboard retrospectively cited Like a Prayer as Madonna's best album in 2015.

 Track listing 
All tracks written and produced by Madonna and Patrick Leonard, except where noted.Notes"Spanish Eyes" was re-titled "Pray for Spanish Eyes" on certain editions of the album.
In the album's notes "The powers that be" (Madonna and Leonard) are credited as the producers of "Act of Contrition".

 Personnel 
Credits adapted from the album's liner notes. Musicians  Madonna – lead vocals, backing vocals, additional synthesizers
 Patrick Leonard – acoustic piano, Hammond B3 organ, clavinet, synthesizers
 Stephen Bray – synthesizers
 Jai Winding – synthesizers
 Geary Lanier – clavinet
 Prince – guitars, vocals
 Bruce Gaitsch – guitars, acoustic guitar
 Dann Huff – guitars
 Chester Kamen – guitars
 David Williams – guitars
 Marcos Loya – requinto guitar, backing vocals
 Randy Jackson – bass
 Guy Pratt – bass
 Jonathan Moffett – drums
 Jeff Porcaro – drums
 John Robinson – drums
 Luis Conte – percussion
 Paulinho da Costa – percussion
 Joe Porcaro – marimba
 Sandra Crouch – tambourine
 David Boruff – brass section
 Dick Hyde – brass section
 Chuck Findley – brass section, horn arrangements
 Steven Madaio – brass section
 Joe Mayer – French horn
 Richard Todd – French horn
 Larry Corbett – cello
 Bill Meyers – string arrangements and conductor
 Suzie Katayama – concertmaster
 The Andraé Crouch Choir – backing vocals
 Rose Banks – backing vocals
 Donna De Lory – backing vocals
 Lynne Fiddmont – backing vocals
 Niki Haris – backing vocals
 Marilyn Martin – backing vocals
 Ali Nadirah – backing vocals Production and design '''

 Madonna – producer
 Patrick Leonard – producer
 Stephen Bray – producer
 Prince – producer
 Bill Bottrell – sound engineer, mixing
 Heidi Hanschu – sound engineer
 Eddie Miller – sound engineer
 Stephen Shelton – sound engineer
 Michael Vail Blum – additional engineer
 Stacy Baird – assistant engineer
 Robert Salcedo – assistant engineer
 Joe Schiff – assistant engineer
 Bob Ludwig – mastering at Masterdisk (New York City, New York)
 John Good – drum technician
 Harry McCarthy – drum technician
 Ivy Skoff – production coordinator
 Herb Ritts – photography
 Jeri Heiden – art direction
 Margo Chase – logo design
 Freddy DeMann – management
 Melissa Crow – management
 Elisa Lane – management

Charts

Weekly charts

Year-end charts

Certifications and sales

See also 

 List of best-selling albums by women
 List of best-selling albums in Brazil
 List of best-selling albums in Europe
 List of best-selling albums in Italy
 List of best-selling albums in Turkey
 List of Australian chart achievements and milestones
 List of Billboard 200 number-one albums of 1989
 List of UK Albums Chart number ones of the 1980s
 List of number-one hits of 1989 (Germany)

References

Bibliography

External links 
 
 
 Library + Archives: Like a Prayer at the Rock and Roll Hall of Fame

1989 albums
Albums produced by Patrick Leonard
Albums produced by Stephen Bray
Albums produced by Prince (musician)
Albums produced by Madonna
Madonna albums
Sire Records albums
Warner Records albums
Albums recorded at United Western Recorders